The Sabines (all exonyms) were an Italic people who lived in the central Apennine Mountains of the ancient Italian Peninsula, also inhabiting Latium north of the Anio before the founding of Rome.

The Sabines divided into two populations just after the founding of Rome, which is described by Roman legend. The division, however it came about, is not legendary. The population closer to Rome transplanted itself to the new city and united with the preexisting citizenry, beginning a new heritage that descended from the Sabines but was also Latinized. The second population remained a mountain tribal state, coming finally to war against Rome for its independence along with all the other Italic tribes. Afterwards, it became assimilated into the Roman Republic.

Etymology
The Sabines derived directly from the ancient Umbrians and belonged to the same ethnic group as the Samnites and the Sabelli, as attested by the common ethnonymous of Safineis (in ancient Greek ) and by the toponyms safinim and safina (at the origin of the terms Samnium and Sabinum). The Indo-European root  or  evolved into the word , which later became Safin.

At some point in prehistory, a population speaking a common language extended over both Samnium and Umbria. Salmon conjectures that it was common Italic and puts forward a date of 600 BC, after which the common language began to separate into dialects. This date does not necessarily correspond to any historical or archaeological evidence; developing a synthetic view of the ethnology of proto-historic Italy is an incomplete and ongoing task.

Linguist Julius Pokorny carries the etymology somewhat further back. Conjecturing that the -a- was altered from an -o- during some prehistoric residence in Illyria, he derives the names from an o-grade extension *swo-bho- of an extended e-grade *swe-bho- of the possessive adjective, *s(e)we-, of the reflexive pronoun, *se-, "oneself" (the source of English self). The result is a set of Indo-European tribal names (if not the endonym of the Indo-Europeans): Germanic Suebi and Semnones, Suiones; Celtic Senones; Slavic Serbs and Sorbs; Italic Sabelli, Sabini, etc., as well as a large number of kinship terms.

Language
There is little record of the Sabine language; however, there are some glosses by ancient commentators, and one or two inscriptions have been tentatively identified as Sabine. There are also personal names in use on Latin inscriptions from the Sabine country, but these are given in Latin form. Robert Seymour Conway, in his Italic Dialects, gives approximately 100 words which vary from being well-attested as Sabine to being possibly of Sabine origin. In addition to these he cites place names derived from the Sabine, sometimes giving attempts at reconstructions of the Sabine form. Based on all the evidence, the Linguist List tentatively classifies Sabine as a member of the Umbrian group of Italic languages of the Indo-European family.

Historical geography
Latin-speakers called the Sabines' original territory, straddling the modern regions of Lazio, Umbria, and Abruzzo, Sabinum. , it bears the ancient tribe's name in the Italian form of Sabina. Within the modern region of Lazio (or Latium), Sabina constitutes a sub-region, situated north-east of Rome, around Rieti.

History

Origin and early history

The Sabines settled in Sabinum, around the X century BC, founding the cities of Reate, Trebula Mutuesca and Cures Sabini. Dionysius of Halicarnassus mentions the Sabines in relation to the Aborigines, from whom they allegedly stole their capital Lista, with a surprise war action starting from Amiternum. Ancient historians debated the specific origins of the Sabines. According to Strabo the Sabines, after a long war with the Umbrians, migrated to the land of the Opici, following the ancient Italic rite of the Ver Sacrum. The Sabines then drove out the Opici and encamped in that region. Zenodotus of Troezen claimed that the Sabines were originally Umbrians that changed their name after being driven from the Reatine territory by the Pelasgians. Porcius Cato argued that the Sabines were a populace named after Sabus, the son of Sancus (a divinity of the area sometimes called Jupiter Fidius). In another account mentioned in Dionysius's work, a group of Lacedaemonians fled Sparta since they regarded the laws of Lycurgus as too severe. In Italy, they founded the Spartan colony of Foronia (near the Pomentine plains) and some from that colony settled among the Sabines. According to the account, the Sabine habits of belligerence (aggressive or warlike behavior) and frugality (prudence in avoiding waste) were known to have derived from the Spartans. Plutarch also mentions, in the Life of Numa Pompilius, "Sabines, who declare themselves to be a colony of the Lacedaemonians". Plutarch also wrote that the Pythagoras of Sparta, who was Olympic victor in the foot-race, helped Numa arrange the government of the city and many Spartan customs introduced by him to the Numa and the people.

At Rome

Legend of the Sabine women

Legend says that the Romans abducted Sabine women to populate the newly built Rome. The resultant war ended only by the women throwing themselves and their children between the armies of their fathers and their husbands. The Rape of the Sabine Women became a common motif in art; the women ending the war is a less frequent but still reappearing motif.

According to Livy, after the conflict, the Sabine and Roman states merged, and the Sabine king Titus Tatius jointly ruled Rome with Romulus until Tatius' death five years later. Three new centuries of Equites were introduced at Rome, including one named Tatienses, after the Sabine king.

A variation of the story is recounted in the pseudepigraphal Sefer haYashar (see Jasher 17:1–15).

Traditions
Tradition suggests that the population of the early Roman kingdom was the result of a union of Sabines and others. Some of the gentes of the Roman republic were proud of their Sabine heritage, such as the Claudia gens, assuming Sabinus as a cognomen or agnomen. Some specifically Sabine deities and cults were known at Rome: Semo Sancus and Quirinus, and at least one area of the town, the Quirinale, where the temples to those latter deities were located, had once been a Sabine centre. The extravagant claims of Varro and Cicero that augury, divination by dreams and the worship of Minerva and Mars originated with the Sabines are disputable, as they were general Italic and Latin customs, as well as Etruscan, even though they were espoused by Numa Pompilius, second king of Rome and a Sabine.

Religion
 Dius Fidius
 Feronia
 Ops
 Quirinus
 Sabus
 Sancus
 Soranus
 Vacuna
 Varro's list of Sabine gods
 Flora

State

During the expansion of ancient Rome, there were a series of conflicts with the Sabines. Manius Curius Dentatus conquered the Sabines in 290 BC. The citizenship without the right of suffrage was given to the Sabines in the same year. The right of suffrage was granted to the Sabines in 268 BC.

Prominent Sabines

Gentes of Sabine origin

Romans of Sabine ancestry
Titus Tatius, legendary King of the Sabines
Numa Pompilius, legendary King of Rome
Ancus Marcius, legendary King of Rome
Quintus Sertorius, republican general
Attius Clausus, founder of the Roman Claudia gens
Gaius Sallustius Crispus, Roman writer
Marcus Terentius Varro, Roman scholar
Vespasian, Roman emperor and founder of the Flavian dynasty

See also

Ancient peoples of Italy
Hostus Hostilius

References

Sources

Ancient
Ovid, Fasti (Book III, 167–258)
 Ovid, Ars Amatoria (Book I, 102)
Livy, Ab urbe condita (Book I, 9–14)
Cicero, De Republica (Book II, 12–14)
Plutarch, Parallel Lives (Romulus, 14–20)
Juvenal, Satires (Book III, 81–85)

Modern

Further reading
Brown, Robert. "Livy's Sabine Women and the Ideal of Concordia." Transactions of the American Philological Association 125 (1995): 291-319. .
MacLachlan, Bonnie. Women In Ancient Rome: A Sourcebook. London: Bloomsbury Academic, 2013.

 
Ancient Abruzzo
History of Lazio
History of Umbria